Rathaus Essen is a 22-storey,  skyscraper in Essen, Germany. When completed on 1 July 1979, it was the tallest city hall in Europe, and is currently the tallest city hall in Germany.

References

External links 

 Essen Town Hall and Service

City and town halls in Germany
Buildings and structures in Essen
Government buildings completed in 1979
Modernist architecture in Germany
Skyscrapers in Essen
Skyscraper office buildings in Germany